Superdad is a 1973 American comedy film by Walt Disney Productions starring Bob Crane, Barbara Rush, Kurt Russell, Joe Flynn, and Kathleen Cody. Directed by Vincent McEveety, the film marks the motion picture debut of Bruno Kirby.

Plot
Charlie McCready (Bob Crane) tries to wrest his daughter Wendy (Kathleen Cody) from her childhood friends, whom he believes have no ambition.  He especially disapproves of her boyfriend, Bart (Kurt Russell).  Initially he makes a few attempts to bridge the generation gap, but to no avail.  For instance, he attempts to impress his daughter's friends by trying his hand at beach volleyball and water skiing, but both attempts result in humiliating accidents.  Late in the summer, Wendy receives a letter informing her that she's won a full scholarship to her parents' alma mater, Huntington College.  Unbeknownst to her, the letter is fake; her father has paid the first year's tuition himself, and had a friend at the college send the letter to her.  He did this so Wendy would not attend City College with Bart and her other friends.

Charlie later visits Wendy at Huntington, and discovers that the college has changed considerably since he attended there.  Wendy later discovers his plot, and joins the campus counterculture as a way of getting even.  She inadvertently becomes engaged to a hippie artist named Klutch.  Charlie attempts to intervene on her behalf, and ends up in a fistfight with Klutch.  Wendy's boyfriend Bart comes to the rescue.  At this point, Charlie learns that Bart had turned down a scholarship to Huntington College so he could be near Wendy who he believed (correctly) had not been awarded a scholarship there. The movie ends with Wendy's marriage to Bart.

Cast

 Bob Crane as Charlie McCready
 Barbara Rush as Sue McCready
 Kurt Russell as Bart
 Joe Flynn as Cyrus Hershberger
 Kathleen Cody as Wendy McCready
 Joby Baker as Klutch
 Dick Van Patten as Ira Kushaw
 Bruno Kirby as Stanley Schlimmer
 Judith Lowry as Mother Barlow
 Ivor Francis as Dr. Skinner on TV
 Jonathan Daly as Rev. Griffith
 Naomi Stevens as Mrs. Levin
 Nicholas Hammond as Roger Rhinehurst
 Jack Manning as Justice of the Peace
 Jim Wakefield as House Manager
 Ed McCready as Cab Driver
 Larry Gelman as Mr. Schlimmer
 Stephen Dunne as TV Moderator
 Allison McKay as Secretary
 Leon Belasco as Limousine Driver
 Sarah Fankboner as Scout Girl
 Christina Anderson as Gang
 Ed Begley Jr. as Gang
 Don Carter as Gang
 Joy Ellison as Gang
 Ann Marshall as Gang
 Michael Rupert as Gang

Television
The film appeared on an episode of The Wonderful World of Disney.

Home media
The film was released on the VHS and Betamax formats during the 1980s.  It was released on DVD exclusively to members of the Disney Movie Club on June 1, 2008.

It has also been released on the digital format.

In other media
A poster for Superdad can be seen in a subway car in the original 1974 version of the film Death Wish.

Superdad was featured in the biographical film Auto Focus, with Bob Crane (Greg Kinnear) seeing his role as the leading man in this Disney film as a way to revive his career following the retirement of his hit series Hogan's Heroes. Footage of the film is shown where Crane is on water skis (Kinnear in a re-shoot of that scene), along with a voice-over of how Superdad sat on the shelves for a year before flopping at the box office.

See also

 List of American films of 1973

References

External links
 
 
 
 

1973 films
American comedy films
1973 comedy films
1970s English-language films
Walt Disney Pictures films
Films directed by Vincent McEveety
Films scored by Buddy Baker (composer)
1970s American films